Josep Perarnau i Espelt (born 1928 in Avinyó, Bages) is a Catalan priest, theologian and historian.
He studied Theology in the Pontifical University of Salamanca, University of Rome and Munich. He became a priest in Barcelona. From this position he has made his historical researches. He is member of the Institute of Catalan Studies, and in 1990 he was appointed numerary member.

He is deeply interested in the Middle Ages history, and he has studied mediaeval manuscripts, specially the ones of Catalan authors. From his position as director of the Arxiu de textos catalans antics (ATCA) (Archive of Ancient Catalan Texts) of the Institute of Catalan Studies he has made valuable researches of unpublished works of the Middle Ages of authors such as Ramon Llull or Arnau de Vilanova.

He has gathered all the forgeries that the 14th century inquisitor Nicolau Eimeric used in order to decree the existence of more than a hundred heresies in Ramon Llull's texts.

In 1993 Josep Perarnau was awarded with the Serra d'Or Critics Prize about research, in 1996 with the Cultural Heritage National Prize and in 1998 with the Narcís Monturiol Medal. These two last awards were given by the Generalitat de Catalunya (Catalan regional government). On 28 April 2009 he received an honorary degree by the University of Barcelona.

References

External links
 Information about Josep Perarnau in the Institute of Catalan Studies website. 
 Article in the Great Catalan Encyclopedia. 

Living people
1928 births
Pontifical University of Salamanca alumni
Members of the Institute for Catalan Studies
Historians from Catalonia
Roman Catholic priests from Catalonia
20th-century Spanish Roman Catholic theologians
Spanish expatriates in Italy
Spanish expatriates in Germany